Tropical Nights is the eighth studio album by American actress and singer Liza Minnelli. It was recorded at Hollywood Sound Recorders and Western Studio One and produced by Rik Pekkonen and Steve March. The CD was released in 2002. The album was again re-released in CD by Cherry Red Records with 5 additional bonus tracks.

Track listing

Personnel
Paulinho da Costa - percussion

References

Liza Minnelli albums
1977 albums
Columbia Records albums
Albums recorded at United Western Recorders